John Black Paterson (6 December 1900 – 30 November 1975) was an Australian rules footballer who played with Geelong in the Victorian Football League (VFL).

Family
The son of Robert Sturrock Paterson (1860–1938), and Isabelle Paterson, née Ison (1863–1942), John Black Paterson was born at Boort, Victoria on 6 December 1900.

He married Isabella May James (1902–1938) on 23 October 1929. They were divorced in 1936. He married Bernice Irma Dinse (1910–1970) in 1939.

Football
He played at centre half-forward in the Geelong Second XVIII team that won the 1923 Seconds' premiership, defeating Richmond, 9.12 (66) to 5.10 (40).

Military service
Paterson later served in the Australian Army during World War II. He was taken prisoner of war during fighting in Greece in 1941, and was held at Oflag VII-B in Eichstätt in Germany.

Notes

References
 PATERSON, John Black (1900–1975), Geelong College.
 Personal Notes, The Argus, (Monday, 28 July 1941), p.3.
 The A.I.F. Roll of Honor, The Age, (Tuesday, 29 July 1941), p.6.
 Missing Officers Located, The Argus, (Thursday, 31 July 1941), p.3.
 
 B883, VX5070: World War Two Service Record: Lieutenant John Blach (sic) Paterson (VX5070), National Archives of Australia.

External links 
 
 

1900 births
1975 deaths
People educated at Geelong College
Australian rules footballers from Victoria (Australia)
Geelong Football Club players
Australian prisoners of war
World War II prisoners of war held by Germany
Australian Army personnel of World War II
Australian Army officers